Kamil Oziemczuk (born 29 March 1988 in Lublin) is a Polish footballer who plays for Hetman Zamość.

Career

Club
Oziemczuk began his career at Górnik Łęczna before moving to AJ Auxerre in June 2006. In September 2008 he joined Motor Lublin.

International
He also appeared at the 2006 European U-19 Championship.

External links
 
 

1988 births
Living people
Górnik Łęczna players
AJ Auxerre players
Motor Lublin players
Polish footballers
Sportspeople from Lublin
Association football forwards